Hehr is a surname. Notable people with the surname include:

Addison Hehr (1909–1971), American art director
Kent Hehr (born 1969), Canadian politician